Hypsopygia kawabei is a species of snout moth in the genus Hypsopygia. It was described by Hiroshi Yamanaka in 1965. It is found in Korea and Japan.

The wingspan is 16–20 mm. The forewings are yellowish ash gray mixed with fuscous scales. The hindwings are pale bright gray. Adults are on wing from July to August.

References

Moths described in 1965
Pyralini
Moths of Japan